Stimulopalpus is a genus of tropical barklice in the family Amphientomidae. There are at least 30 described species in Stimulopalpus.

Species
These 30 species belong to the genus Stimulopalpus:

 Stimulopalpus acutipinnatus Li, 2002
 Stimulopalpus africanus Enderlein, 1907
 Stimulopalpus angustivalvus Li, 2002
 Stimulopalpus baeoivalvus Li, 2002
 Stimulopalpus biocellatus Badonnel, 1949
 Stimulopalpus brunneus (New, 1975)
 Stimulopalpus changjiangicus Li, 1997
 Stimulopalpus cochleatus Li, 2002
 Stimulopalpus concinnus Li, 2002
 Stimulopalpus conflexus Li, 2002
 Stimulopalpus distinctus Smithers, 1995
 Stimulopalpus dolichogonus Li, 2002
 Stimulopalpus erromerus Li, 2002
 Stimulopalpus estipitatus Li, 2002
 Stimulopalpus exilis Li, 2002
 Stimulopalpus furcatus Li, 2002
 Stimulopalpus galactospilus Li, 2002
 Stimulopalpus heteroideus Li, 2002
 Stimulopalpus huashanensis Li, 2002
 Stimulopalpus immediatus Li, 2002
 Stimulopalpus introcurvus Li, 2002
 Stimulopalpus isoneurus Li, 2002
 Stimulopalpus japonicus Enderlein, 1906
 Stimulopalpus medifascus Li, 2002
 Stimulopalpus mimeticus Li, 1997
 Stimulopalpus peltatus Li, 2002
 Stimulopalpus pentospilus Li, 2002
 Stimulopalpus phaeospilus Li, 1999
 Stimulopalpus polychaetus Li, 2002
 Stimulopalpus psednopetalus Li, 2002

References

Troctomorpha
Articles created by Qbugbot